Mimodorcadion is a monotypic beetle genus in the family Cerambycidae described by Stephan von Breuning in 1942. Its only species, Mimodorcadion indicum, was described by Félix Édouard Guérin-Méneville in 1844.

References

Morimopsini
Beetles described in 1844
Monotypic beetle genera